Gordon Tracy is a fictional character from Gerry Anderson's Supermarionation television show Thunderbirds, the subsequent films Thunderbirds Are Go and Thunderbird 6 as well as the remake TV series Thunderbirds Are Go. The character also appeared in the live action movie Thunderbirds.

Thunderbirds (1965-66)
Born on 14 February 2004 or 2043, Gordon Tracy revels in all aquatic sports, from skin-diving to water-skiing. Named after astronaut Leroy Gordon Cooper, he is a highly trained aquanaut, with stints in the Submarine Service and the World Aquanaut Security Patrol, the same organisation that is used in the  Stingray (1964 TV series) under his belt. During his time with the WASPs, Gordon commanded a deep-sea bathyscaphe and spent a year beneath the ocean investigating marine farming methods. An expert oceanographer, he is also the designer of a unique underwater breathing apparatus, which he has modified and improved for International Rescue.

Shortly before International Rescue began operating, Gordon was involved in a hydrofoil speedboat crash when his vessel capsized at 400 knots. The craft was completely shattered and Gordon spent four months in a hospital bed. Now, as the pilot of Thunderbird 4, he commands the world's most advanced and versatile one-man submarine. Good-natured and high-spirited, he possesses a strength and tenacity that make him a respected leader and commander. He is also one of the world's fastest freestyle swimmers and is a past Olympic champion at the butterfly stroke.

In addition to being the pilot of Thunderbird 4, Gordon is also the co-pilot of Thunderbird 2, and thus often accompanies Virgil.

Of all the family, Gordon is the funny one, which gives him a tendency to get into trouble with Jeff over his flippant sense of humour. For example, in "Day of Disaster", somebody has taken Grandma's personal edible transmitter, and Gordon proves his innocence when he says he'd know if he'd taken a transmitter, but Jeff gets annoyed. Gordon's favourite pastimes are playing chess (often with Scott or Brains), going fishing and playing the guitar.

Thunderbirds (2004)
Ben Torgeson plays Gordon in the 2004 live action film, which focuses on Alan Tracy; as such, not much is known about this version of the character. According to Alex Pang's Thunderbirds: X-Ray Cross Sections, he is 18, and a recent graduate from Wharton Academy, the school that Alan attends at the start of the film. He is noted to still be training on the Thunderbirds craft, with a year remaining until he is permitted to fly solo.

Thunderbirds Are Go! (2015-20)
David Menkin plays Gordon in the 2015 CGI redux of Thunderbirds, entitled Thunderbirds Are Go!. He is now a blonde, instead of being a redhead (he and John have traded hair colours, as have Scott and Virgil). As well as piloting Thunderbird 4, he also pilots various devices flown around by Thunderbird 2, such as the new Elevator Cars in "Fireflash". Again, he's the funny one, and is also described as having a loud voice, dwarfed only by his clothing tastes. His IR outfit now has a scuba-diving mouthpiece attached to his now-yellow sash (it was orange in the original series).

Similar to his older brother John he seems to have been given a romantic interest in the reboot - in Gordon's case Lady Penelope.

Carolyn Percy of the Wales Arts Review comments that whereas the 1960s puppet character was one of the least developed Tracy brothers, this version of Gordon is characterised as a "light-hearted joker".

References

External links
 Thunderbirds Characters

American male characters in television
Gordon Cooper
Fictional aquatics sportspeople
Fictional navy personnel
Fictional Olympic competitors
Fictional scuba divers
Film characters introduced in 1966
Male characters in animated series
Male characters in film
Television characters introduced in 1965
Thunderbirds (TV series) characters
Fictional people from the 21st-century